The following is a summary of notable events and releases of the year 2010 in Swedish music.

Events

June
 9 – The 19th Sweden Rock Festival started in Norje (June 9–12).

December
 11 – Elisas wins the 2010 edition of Dansbandskampen.

Summary

Sweden is one of the largest exporters of pop and rock music in the world. Many Swedish artists have enjoyed success on the British and American charts and in other English speaking countries.

Other famous musicians of today are:

Pop
Robyn, Agnes, Darin, September, Alcazar, Danny Saucedo, Velvet

Rock
Mando Diao, Takida, Johnossi, The Hives, Kent

Rap
Lazee, Adam Tensta

Dance
Swedish House Mafia, Eric Prydz, Basshunter

New Artists
Anna Bergendahl, Eric Saade, PLAY (Reunion)

Number ones

Number-one singles

Number-one albums

Number-one downloads

Svensktoppen

Album Releases

January
12/1 – Skånska Mord – The Last Supper
22/1 – Asteroid – II

February
8/2 – Thunder Express – Republic Disgrace
24/2 – Dark Tranquillity – We Are the Void

March
10/3 – Soreption – Deterioration Of Minds
12/3 – Abramis Brama – Rubicon
15/3 – Katatonia – The Longest Year
24/3 – Linda Sundblad – Manifest
26/3 – At The Gates – Purgatory Unleashed – Live at Wacken
31/3 – Doomdogs – Doomdogs

April
7/4 – Engel – Threnody
12/4 – Agnes – Dance Love Pop (Australian/New Zealand Edit)
14/4 – Crashdïet – Generation Wild
21/4 – Dundertåget – Dom feta åren är förbi
21/4 – Anna Bergendahl – Yours Sincerely
21/4 – Zombiekrig – Undantagstillstånd
21/4 – The Haunted- Road Kill
23/4 – SnakeStorm- Choose Your Finger
28/4 – Timoteij – Längtan

May
5/5 – Hate Ammo – Bound by Hate
7/5 – Chris Laney – Only Come Out At Night
12/5 – Pain Of Salvation – Road Salt One
19/5 – Eric Saade – Masquerade
19/5 – April Divine – Redemption
21/5 – Sabaton – Coat of Arms
24/5 – Agnes – Dance Love Pop (UK Edit)
28/5 – Imperial State Electric – Imperial State Electric
28/5 – Sideburn – The Demon Dance

June
7/6 – Watain – Lawless Darkness
9/6 – Oskar Linnros – Vilja Bli
14/6 – Robyn – Body Talk Pt. 1
23/6 – Grand Magus – Hammer Of The North
24/6 – Kent – En plats i solen

July
5/7 – 8-Point Rose – Primigenia
2 – Soilwork – The Panic Broadcast
19 – Layers of Live – Darkane
20 – Soilwork – The Sledgehammer Files: The Best of Soilwork 1998-2008

August
18/8 – Darin – Lovekiller
18/8 – Pray For Locust – Swarm

September
1/9 – Sonic Syndicate – We Rule The Night
6/9 – Robyn – Body Talk Pt. 2
14/9 – Dungen – Skit I Allt (Mexican Summer).
20/9 – Opeth – In Live Concert at the Royal Albert Hall
22/9 – Raubtier – Skriet från vildmarken
22/9 – Therion – Sitra Ahra
28/9 – October Tide – A Thin Shell
29/9 – The Crown – Doomsday King

October

6/10 – Corroded – Exit To Transfer
15/10 – Despite – Clenched
27/10 – Nicke Borg Homeland – Chapter 1
29/10 – Ghost – Opus Eponymous
29/10 – Stonewall Noise Orchestra – Sweet Mississippi Deal

November
12/11 – Chuck Norris Experiment – Dead Central
26/11 – Hardcore Superstar – Split Your Lip

December

See also
2010 in Sweden

References

 
Music
Swedish music by year
Sweden